2015/16 ANDRA Drag Racing Series was an Australian National Drag Racing Association sanctioned drag racing series in Australia. The championship started in Darwin at Hidden Valley Raceway and finished in Adelaide in April.

The series was televised on SBS Speedweek on Sundays 2 pm, Shows will also air on Fox Sports. Replays of all shows can watched via SBS On Demand or online through Motorsports TV, ANDRA Catch Up TV and Speedweek.com.au. MAVTV will show ANDRA Drag Racing in the US and Motors TV in Europe.

2015-2016 ANDRA Championship Drag Racing Calendar

2015/16 Results

See also

Motorsport in Australia
List of Australian motor racing series

References

External links

Drag racing events
2015 in Australian motorsport
2016 in Australian motorsport